Malard-e Shomali Rural District is in the Central District of Malard County, Tehran province, Iran. At the National Census of 2006, its constituent villages were in the former Malard District of Shahriar County. There were 31,288 inhabitants in 8,532 households at the following census of 2011, by which time the district had been separated from the county and Malard County established. At the most recent census of 2016, the population of the rural district was 31,362 in 9,126 households. The largest of its 14 villages was Shahrak-e Jafariyeh, with 9,452 people.

References 

Malard County

Rural Districts of Tehran Province

Populated places in Tehran Province

Populated places in Malard County